Comitas murrawolga is a species of sea snail, a marine gastropod mollusc in the family Pseudomelatomidae.

Description
The length of the shell attains 76 mm.

Distribution
This marine species occurs off the Philippines, New Caledonia and Australia (New South Wales, Queensland, South Australia, Tasmania, Victoria, Western Australia)

References

 Garrard, T.A. 1961. Mollusca collected by M. V. "Challenger" off the east coast of Australia. Journal of the Malacological Society of Australia 5: 3–38 
 Powell, A.W.B. 1968. The turrid shellfish of Australian waters. Australian Natural History 1 16: 1–6
 Powell, A.W.B. 1969. The family Turridae in the Indo-Pacific. Part. 2. The subfamily Turriculinae. Indo-Pacific Mollusca 2(10): 207–415, pls 188–324
 Wilson, B. 1994. Australian marine shells. Prosobranch gastropods. Kallaroo, WA : Odyssey Publishing Vol. 2 370 pp.
 Sysoev A. & Bouchet P. (2001) New and uncommon turriform gastropods (Gastropoda: Conoidea) from the South-West Pacific. In: P. Bouchet & B.A. Marshall (eds), Tropical Deep-Sea Benthos, volume 22. Mémoires du Muséum National d'Histoire Naturelle 185: 271-320

External links
  Beechey, D. 2004. Comitas murrawolga (Garrard, 1961).
 Bouchet, Philippe, et al. "A quarter-century of deep-sea malacological exploration in the South and West Pacific: where do we stand? How far to go." Tropical deep-sea Benthos 25 (2008): 9-40
 

murrawolga
Gastropods described in 1961